Senator McCaffrey may refer to:

Francis J. McCaffrey Jr. (1902–1972), New York State Senate
Francis J. McCaffrey (1917–1989), New York State Senate
Michael McCaffrey (born 1963), Rhode Island State Senate